Max Van Ville (born January 13, 1987), a.k.a. VANVILLE, is an American DJ, producer and actor from Hollywood, Los Angeles.

Filmography

External links

American DJs
1987 births
Living people
American male actors
Place of birth missing (living people)
American producers